Vachellia erioloba, the camel thorn, also known as the giraffe thorn, mokala tree, or Kameeldoring in Afrikaans, still more commonly known as Acacia erioloba, is a tree of southern Africa in the family Fabaceae. Its preferred habitat is the deep dry sandy soils in parts of South Africa, Botswana, the western areas of Zimbabwe and Namibia. It is also native to Angola, south-west Mozambique, Zambia and Eswatini. The tree was first described by Ernst Heinrich Friedrich Meyer and Johann Franz Drège in 1836. The camel thorn is a protected tree in South Africa.

The tree can grow up to 20 metres high. It is slow-growing, very hardy to drought and fairly frost-resistant. The light-grey colored thorns reflect sunlight, and the bipinnate leaves close when it is hot. The wood is dark reddish-brown in colour and extremely dense and strong. It is good for fires, which leads to widespread clearing of dead trees and the felling of healthy trees. It produces ear-shaped pods, favoured by many herbivores including cattle. The seeds can be roasted and used as a substitute for coffee beans.

The name 'camel thorn' refers to the fact that giraffe (kameelperd in Afrikaans) commonly feed on the leaves with their specially-adapted tongue and lips that can avoid the thorns. The scientific name 'erioloba' means "wooly lobe", a reference to the ear-shaped pods.

It is commonly associated with the long running PBS wildlife program Nature, as the tree is used in the title sequence and program logo.

Gallery

References

External links
 

erioloba
Flora of South Tropical Africa
Flora of Southern Africa
Trees of Africa
Protected trees of South Africa